Sabaidee Luang Prabang (English title: Good Morning, Luang Prabang) is a 2008 romantic drama film directed by Sakchai Deenan and starring Ananda Everingham. It was the first commercial film shot in Laos since the country adopted communism in 1975.

Plot
Sorn (Everingham), a Thai photographer visiting Laos, falls in love with his beautiful Laotian tour guide, Noi (Pallawong). The film features several tourist sites in Laos.

Cast
Ananda Everingham as Sorn 
Khamly Philawong as Noi

Production
Director Sakchai Deenan claimed the plotline was inspired by a visit to Laos in which he fell in love with a Laotian woman and imagining her as a tour guide. He deliberately created a simple plot "so it would not be too hard to get approval from the Lao government." Previously, the only Laotian films were propaganda and patriotism related, produced by the government. A government member oversaw the production of Sabaidee Luang Prabang so that it portrayed Laotian culture in a positive manner and cut any scenes that the Lao government may perceive to be controversial.

Release
The film premiered on May 24, 2008, at one of Laos' two theaters (both located in its capital, Vientiane) and was released in Thai on June 5. Open-air screenings occurred throughout Laos, including the UNESCO World Heritage city of Luang Prabang. Upon its release, it was the first Laotian private film, authorities seeing Sabaidee Luang Prabang as the start of a new source of income. The aim of the film was also to encourage bilateral cooperation between Thailand and Laos.

References

External links 
 

2008 films
Laotian films
2008 romantic drama films
Thai multilingual films
2008 multilingual films